The , also known as , is a Japanese intelligence agency under the Cabinet Secretariat responsible for gathering, processing, and analyzing national security information for the cabinet. As a principal member of the Japanese intelligence community, the CIRO reports directly to the Prime Minister.

The agency is said to be an equal to the American Central Intelligence Agency. 

Like most intelligence agencies in Japan, its personnel are usually recruited from other agencies. Around 100 out of 170 CIRO agents are from other agencies/ministries with top positions occupied by career police officers.

The CIRO frequently works with the National Security Council as a communication channel to the prime minister. The CIRO is headquartered in Chiyoda, Tokyo, in a building called "H20".

History
But due to widespread opposition, this plan was discarded. The CRO was later renamed as the CIRO in 1986.

The Cabinet Intensive Information Center was established on April 11, 1996 to ensure that the CIRO can inform the Prime Minister in case of severe emergencies. It's located in the Prime Minister's residence.

In August 2007, discussions of intelligence reforms through the paper Improvement of Counter-Intelligence Functions resulted in the establishment of the Counterintelligence Center. It's been suggested that the CIC can be used as the basis for the creation  of an actual external intelligence agency similar to the CIA.

In 2013, CIRO satellite imagery analysis was used to assist NGOs in Tacloban for reconstruction work in the wake of Typhoon Haiyan.

Since 2015, CIRO agents are usually recruited to be sent to the International Counter-Terrorism Intelligence Collection Unit.

In 2016, the business magazine Facta reported that the government of Shinzo Abe had directed the CIRO to spy on a legal council connected to David Kaye, who as U.N. special rapporteur on freedom of expression stated "deep and genuine concern" on declining media independence in Japan.

Spy scandal
On January 17, 2008, an official of Naichō was charged for spying for Russians, passing them classified information. The Russians denied the claim. Since then, there had been calls for greater accountability on Naichō.

Organization 

According to its official web site, organization of Naichō is as follows:

 Cabinet Intelligence Officer

Divisions:
: Has Human Resources, Budget and academic experts.
: Collect information based on domestic media, including newspapers, magazines and from news broadcasts.
: Collect information based on foreign media and broadcasts from another country, including CIRO agents based overseas.
: Studies domestic/international economic information.
: Secures information related to disasters and other emergencies. Staffed by twenty agents from the Ministry of Defense, National Police Agency, Fire Disaster and Management Agency and the Japan Coast Guard.

: Operates a network of surveillance satellites, such as the IGS-Optical and IGS-Radar series. As of June 2018, Japan has six functioning observation satellites in orbit. It was established in 2001 and has 320 personnel employed with at least 100 of them being imagery intelligence analysts. The Deputy Director position is filled by a senior officer from the NPA.
 Situation Center of Cabinet

 : Coordinates government action based on the " Improvement of Counter-Intelligence Functions " policy.
 Cabinet Counter Terrorism Intelligence Coordination Center

Known heads of Naichō
 Yoshio Omori
 Kazuhiro Sugita (Jan. 2001–Apr. 2001)
 Toshinori Kanemoto (Apr. 2001–Apr. 2006)
 Hideshi Mitani (Apr. 2006–Apr. 2010)
 Shinichi Uematsu (Apr. 2010–Dec. 2011)
 Shigeru Kitamura (Dec. 2011 – September 2019)
 Hiroaki Takizawa (September 2019 – Present)

References

Bibliography

External links
  
  

1952 establishments in Japan
1986 establishments in Japan
Japanese intelligence agencies
Cabinet Office (Japan)